Alpe-Adria is a bioregion in Central Europe, embracing all of Slovenia, the Austrian states of Carinthia and Styria, and the Italian regions of Friuli-Venezia-Giulia and Veneto. , it is the subject of a proposal to create the world's first organic bioregion.

Italy and Austria were the pioneers in organic farming and are today leading the field, with Austria having over 23% and Italy 15% organic agriculture . Slovenia has been gradually catching up since its independence in 1991. Its organic sector grew from being less than 0.1% of Slovenian agriculture in 1998, to reaching 10% , surpassing the European Union average of 7%.

See also
 The Alps-Adriatic Working Group
 Alpe Adria Cup, a men's basketball competition involving teams from Austria, Croatia, the Czech Republic, Poland, Slovakia, and Slovenia

References
Feffer, John, "The Organic Alternative: Slovenia, the European Union, and the Debate over Sustainable Agriculture. Synthesis/Regeneration, Spring 2005, Number 37.
Eurostat, Agriculture: EU organic area up 25% since 2012, January 2019

Organic farming in Europe